(local nickname TDL) is a  theme park at the Tokyo Disney Resort in Urayasu, Chiba Prefecture, Japan, near Tokyo. Its main gate is directly adjacent to both Maihama Station and Tokyo Disneyland Station. It was the first Disney park to be built outside the United States and it opened on April 15, 1983. The park was constructed by WED Enterprises in the same style as Magic Kingdom in Florida and Disneyland in California. It is owned by The Oriental Land Company, which licenses intellectual property from The Walt Disney Company. Tokyo Disneyland and its companion park, Tokyo DisneySea, are the only Disney parks in the world not owned or operated by The Walt Disney Company in any capacity.

The park has seven themed areas: the World Bazaar; the four traditional Disney lands: Adventureland, Westernland, Fantasyland and Tomorrowland; and two mini-lands: Critter Country and Toontown. Many of these areas mirror those in the original Disneyland as they are based on American Disney films and fantasies. Fantasyland includes Peter Pan's Flight, Snow White's Scary Adventures, and Dumbo the Flying Elephant, based on Disney films and characters. The park is noted for its extensive open spaces to accommodate the large crowds that visit the park. As of 2019, Tokyo Disneyland is the most visited theme park in Japan and the third-most visited theme park in the world behind Magic Kingdom at Walt Disney World and Disneyland Park at the Disneyland Resort.

Dedication

History
The idea of a Japanese Disneyland dates back to the late 1950s, when Japanese businessman Kunizo Matsuo approached Walt Disney with the idea of a Disney park in Nara. While it is rumored Walt initially agreed to the idea, he later dropped out of it. Matsuo, still determined to open his Disney-themed park, opened Nara Dreamland in 1961, a near replica of Disneyland except without Disney characters or intellectual property. This park would continue to operate until 2006.

Masatomo Takahashi  approached Walt Disney Productions with the idea of Tokyo Disneyland in August 1978. Due to the success of the recently opened Disney World in Florida, Disney and Takahashi negotiated, and the initial contract for the construction of Disneyland in Chiba Prefecture was signed in April 1979. Japanese engineers and architects visited California to tour Disneyland and prepare to construct the new park. The construction of the park began a year later and was covered by hundreds of reporters as an indication of the high expectations for the park in the future. The final cost of Tokyo Disneyland was 180 billion yen rather than the projected 100 billion yen.

On February 28, 2020, Disney announced a temporary closure of Tokyo Disneyland and DisneySea from February 29 to combat the COVID-19 pandemic. The closure, originally slated to expire in mid-March, was later extended twice, with the latest extension being until July 1, 2020.

The park began English-language gender neutral announcements in 2021.

Park layout and attractions 

With a few exceptions, Tokyo Disneyland features the same attractions found in Disneyland and Walt Disney World's Magic Kingdom.

World Bazaar

World Bazaar is the main entry corridor and primary shopping area of Tokyo Disneyland. Despite the use of the word "World" in its name, the general look and theme of World Bazaar is that of early 20th-century America, matching the "Main Street, U.S.A." areas of other Magic Kingdom-style parks. World Bazaar consists of two intersecting "streets": Main Street (the primary corridor running from the main entrance toward Cinderella Castle), and Center Street, which forms a perpendicular line with Main Street and leads to Adventureland in one direction and Tomorrowland in the other. World Bazaar has a permanent canopy covering the Main Street and Center Street areas, designed to protect guests from the elements.

Adventureland

Adventureland consists of two distinct yet complementary areas: A New Orleans-themed area and a "jungle"-themed area. It borrows stylistic and architectural features from the New Orleans Square and Adventureland areas found in Disneyland Park in the United States.

Westernland

Westernland is an "old west" themed area, the counterpart of Frontierland in other Magic Kingdom-style parks. The landscape of Westernland is dominated by Big Thunder Mountain, a Monument Valley-style mountain surrounding a mine train roller coaster, and the Rivers of America, a man-made waterway that is home to the Mark Twain Riverboat, Tom Sawyer Island, and numerous live and Audio-Animatronic animals.

Critter Country

Critter Country is a small area of the park and with the key attraction being Splash Mountain.

Fantasyland

Like other Magic Kingdom theme parks, Fantasyland's central entryway is a castle, in this case Cinderella Castle, a near exact copy of the one in Florida's Magic Kingdom. Lacking any "thrill rides," Fantasyland's attractions are generally dark rides that take visitors through scenes from Disney films such as Snow White and the Seven Dwarfs, Peter Pan, and Pinocchio.

A new Beauty and the Beast sub-section opened in September 2020 as part of the theme park's largest expansion. A dark ride named Enchanted Tale of Beauty and the Beast is housed in the new Beauty and the Beast Castle with Maurice's Cottage and Gaston's Fountain at its entrance. The new section also houses Belle's Village which includes the La Taverne de Gaston eatery, and Village Shoppes selling souvenirs and gifts.

A new stage show venue named Fantasyland Forest Theatre is also part of the expansion. With a capacity of 1,500 people, the venue will introduce a 25-minute Mickey's Magical Music World show.

Toontown

Like its counterparts in other Disney theme parks, Toontown (called "Mickey's Toontown" at other Disney parks) is heavily inspired by the movie Who Framed Roger Rabbit. Appropriately, the major attraction here is Roger Rabbit's Car Toon Spin.

A new attraction named Minnie's Style Studio opened in September 2020 as part of the theme park's largest expansion. As a character greeting area, it allows guests to take photos with Minnie who will be wearing a rotating selection of seasonal outfits.

Tomorrowland

As is the case with other modern-day Disney theme parks, Tokyo Disneyland's Tomorrowland forgoes a realism-based vision of the future and instead features science-fiction fantasy themes. Architecturally it borrows much from the 1971–1993 version of Florida's Tomorrowland. Rides include Space Mountain, Star Tours – The Adventures Continue, and Buzz Lightyear's Astro Blasters.

A rotating car ride named The Happy Ride With Baymax opened in September 2020 as part of the theme park's largest expansion. The ride is the first Disney attraction to be themed based on the movie Big Hero 6. A new specialty space-themed popcorn shop named The Big Pop also opened on the same day.

Attendance

Future
Since the park opened in 1983, Tokyo Disney Resort has regularly been one of the most profitable Disney Resorts. By 1994, over 149 million people had entered through the gates of Tokyo Disneyland, more than Japan's entire population of 127.6 million at the time. In 1996, it employed 12,390 people, making Tokyo Disneyland the biggest workplace in Japan's diversionary outings at that time. Many speculate that Tokyo Disneyland is such an economic success due to timing and location; the theme park lies in a metropolitan area with a population of 30 million and opened at the height of a booming economy where hard-working citizens desired an escape from reality.

Tokyo Disneyland states that one of its main aims is to improve the park and diversify from the limits of the domestic Disney parks. Tokyo Disneyland has recently been adding a national identity within the parks by adding attractions with distinctly Japanese qualities. Cinderella Castle displays the Disney character and story plot yet presents the story through the eyes of the Japanese. Once dominated by Disney Legends, Masatomo Takahashi, the former president of The Oriental Land Company, states this growth and development as one of its primary goals: "We must not just repeat what we receive from Disney. I am convinced that we must contribute to the cultural exchange between Japan and U.S.A."

Incidents

See also
List of Tokyo Disneyland attractions
Rail transport in Walt Disney Parks and Resorts
Tokyo DisneySea

References

External links

Official Website

 
Walt Disney Parks and Resorts
Tokyo Disney Resort
1983 establishments in Japan
Amusement parks in Japan
Tourist attractions in Chiba Prefecture
Amusement parks opened in 1983